The 2008 African Women's Championship is of 15–29 November 2008 in Equatorial Guinea. The central African country is the first time host of the tournament. Eight national teams played in group matches and then against each other.

Qualification

Qualified teams

 (hosts)

Tunisia and Congo will compete at the African Championship for the first time.

Squads

.

Final tournament

Group A

Group B

Knockout stage

Semi-finals

Third-place match

Final match

Awards
Equatorial Guinea's Genoveva Añonma was announced player of the tournament and also won the top scorer award with six goals.

Statistics

Goalscorers

References

External links
Tournament at soccerway.com
 RSSSF

 
Women's Football Championship
Women's Africa Cup of Nations tournaments
International association football competitions hosted by Equatorial Guinea
CAF
2008 in Equatoguinean sport